Vriesea vidalii is a plant species in the genus Vriesea. This species is endemic to Brazil.

References

vidalii
Flora of Brazil